The Rap Pack was the name of a British musical group formed by presenters of a Pan-European London-based music channel called Music Box, which existed in the mid 1980s.

The only release by The Rap Pack was a single titled "Back To The Rhythm," which was released in December 1986. They also made an accompanying video, often shown on the channel. The B-side of the 7" single is an instrumental version.

The lyrics of the happy 'rappy' song include several references to Music Box shows.

Band members
Timmy Mallett
Amanda Redington
Nino Firetto
Simon Potter
Martin Buchanan
Steve Blacknell
Gloria Thomas

External links
Watch the video on YouTube.com

British rock music groups
1980s establishments in England
Musical groups established in the 1980s